Arthur Greenwood,  (8 February 1880 – 9 June 1954) was a British politician.  A prominent member of the Labour Party from the 1920s until the late 1940s, Greenwood rose to prominence within the party as secretary of its research department from 1920 and served as Parliamentary Secretary to the Ministry of Health in the short-lived Labour government of 1924. In 1940, he was instrumental in resolving that Britain would continue fighting Nazi Germany in World War II.

Early life
Greenwood was born in Hunslet, Leeds, the son of a painter and decorator. He was educated at the Yorkshire College (which later became the University of Leeds), where he took a BSc.

Political career

Greenwood was first elected to the House of Commons at the 1922 general election for the constituency of Nelson and Colne in Lancashire.  He held the seat until being defeated at the 1931 election, but returned to Parliament the following year, winning a by-election in the Yorkshire constituency of Wakefield.  Greenwood continued to represent Wakefield until his death in 1954. Greenwood was an active freemason, associated with the New Welcome Lodge.

In 1929, Greenwood was appointed Minister of Health remaining in the post until the collapse of the Labour government in August 1931; he was sworn into the Privy Council at the time of his appointment. During his period at the Ministry of Health, Greenwood raised widows' pensions and through the Housing Act 1930 enacted large-scale slum clearance.

Greenwood became Deputy Leader of the Labour Party under Clement Attlee. During the campaign for the 1935 General Election, Greenwood attacked Chancellor of the Exchequer Neville Chamberlain for spending money on rearmament, saying that the rearmament policy was "the merest scaremongering; disgraceful in a statesman of Mr Chamberlain's responsible position, to suggest that more millions of money needed to be spent on armaments."

On 2 September 1939, acting for an indisposed Attlee who was in hospital for prostate surgery, he was called to respond to Neville Chamberlain's ambivalent speech on whether Britain would aid Poland. As he was about to speak, he was interrupted by an angry Conservative backbencher and former First Lord of the Admiralty, Leo Amery, who electrified the chamber when he exclaimed loud and clear: "Speak for England, Arthur!"

A flustered Greenwood proceeded to denounce Chamberlain's remarks, to the applause of both sides of the house of commons, in a short speech for which he is best remembered.

When the wartime coalition government was formed, Winston Churchill appointed him to the War Cabinet as Minister without Portfolio in 1940. He was generally seen as ineffectual, but in May 1940 he emerged as Churchill's strongest and most vocal supporter in the lengthy War Cabinet debates on whether to accept or reject a peace offer from Germany. Without the vote in favour of fighting on by Greenwood and Clement Attlee, Churchill would not have had the slim majority he needed to do so.

After that, his position declined and he resigned in 1943. The same year, he was elected as Treasurer of the Labour Party, beating Herbert Morrison in a close contest.

Until the end of World War II, Greenwood also performed the function of Leader of the Opposition, though he did not receive the salary.

During the Attlee government, he served successively as Lord Privy Seal and Paymaster-General.

Death
Greenwood was cremated at Golders Green Crematorium on 14 June 1954. His ashes and memorial lie in Bay 17 of the East Boundary Wall.

Family

Greenwood's son Anthony Greenwood (later Lord Greenwood, 1911–1982) was an MP from 1946 until 1970, first for Heywood and Radcliffe and later for Rossendale, and a member of Harold Wilson's governments.

References

Sources

External links 

 
 
 
 
 

1880 births
1954 deaths
Alumni of the University of Leeds
Chairs of the Labour Party (UK)
Freemasons of the United Grand Lodge of England
Labour Party (UK) MPs for English constituencies
Lords Privy Seal
Members of the Order of the Companions of Honour
Members of the Privy Council of the United Kingdom
Ministers in the Attlee governments, 1945–1951
Ministers in the Churchill wartime government, 1940–1945
Politics of Wakefield
UK MPs 1922–1923
UK MPs 1923–1924
UK MPs 1924–1929
UK MPs 1929–1931
UK MPs 1931–1935
UK MPs 1935–1945
UK MPs 1945–1950
UK MPs 1950–1951
UK MPs 1951–1955
United Kingdom Paymasters General
British republicans